Let Them Eat Cake is the eighth full-length studio album by the Norwegian rock-band Motorpsycho. Released early in 2000, the album showed the band taking steps in a new direction, leaning more towards jazz and psychedelia than the heavy indie rock guitars the band was famous for.

The EP "The Other Fool" reached nr. 1 on VGs singles-list.

Track listing

LP track listing

Personnel 
Bent Sæther: Vocals, bass, guitars, drums, percussion, Rhodes piano, wood blocks, Minimoog, piano, harmonium
Hans Magnus Ryan: Guitars, vocals, clavinet, double bass, violins, mandolin
Håkon Gebhardt: Drums, vocals, percussion, zither, guitars, piano

with
Helge Sten (Deathprod): drum machine
Baard Slagsvold: Piano, Rhodes piano, back. vocals
Ole Henrik Moe (Ohm): Violins, gong
Kristin Karlsson: violin
Kristin Skjølaas: violin
Einy Langmoen: viola
Kjersti Rydsaa: cello
Arne Frang: tenor saxophone
Jørgen Gjerde: trombone
Erlend Gjerde: trumpet  
Helge Sunde: trombone
Tone Reichelt: waldhorn
Arve Henriksen: trumpet, mellophone

References

External links 
Motorpsycho - Let Them Eat Cake Reviews on Motorpsycho website

2000 albums
Motorpsycho albums